Mobile earth station (also: mobile earth radio station) is – according to Article 1.68 of the International Telecommunication Union's (ITU) ITU Radio Regulations (RR) – defined as «An earth station in the mobile-satellite service intended to be used while in motion or during halts at unspecified points.»

Each station shall be classified by the service in which it operates permanently or temporarily.
See also

Classification
In accordance with ITU Radio Regulations (article 1) this type of radio station might be classified as follows: 
Earth station (article 1.63)
Mobile earth station
Land earth station (article 1.70) of the fixed-satellite service (article 1.21) or mobile-satellite service
Land mobile earth station (article 1.74) of the land mobile-satellite service (article 1.27)
Base earth station (article 1.72) of the fixed-satellite service
Coast earth station (article 1.76) of the fixed-satellite service / mobile-satellite service
Ship earth station (article 1.78) of the mobile-satellite service
Aeronautical earth station (article 1.82) of the fixed-satellite service / mobile-satellite service
Aircraft earth station (article 1.84) of the aeronautical mobile-satellite service (article 1.32)

References / sources 

Radio stations and systems ITU